Freedom Swimmer is a 2021 Australian animated short film directed by Olivia Martin McGuire. The short is a fifteen minute documentary telling the story of a man and his daughter who swam from China to Hong Kong during the Cultural Revolution. Following its premiere at the Melbourne International Film Festival, the short has been featured in several film festivals including Slamdance Film Festival, Palm Springs International ShortsFest and the Calgary International Film Festival, where it was awarded for Best Documentary Short.

Plot 
A grandfather’s embarks on a courageous journey and a perilous swim from China to Hong Kong that parallels his granddaughter’s own quest for a new freedom.

Reception 
Since its launch, the film has been selected in various festivals and academies around the world:

References 

2021 films
2021 short films
Australian animated short films